Joseph Brown was an American football and basketball coach.  He was the fourth head football coach at Eastern Illinois State Normal School now known as—Eastern Illinois University—in Charleston, Illinois, serving for six seasons, from 1904 to 1909, and compiling a record of 11–10–5. Brown was also the first head basketball coach at Eastern Illinois, serving for two seasons, from 1908 to 1910, and tallying a mark of 4–6.

Head coaching record

Football

References

Year of birth missing
Year of death missing
Eastern Illinois Panthers football coaches
Eastern Illinois Panthers men's basketball coaches